Blue Water Sailing is a magazine about and for blue water sailors. It was started in 1996 by George and Rosa Day, who spent five years sailing their Mason 43 ketch around the world. It is sold in 67 countries. The supplement Multihulls Quarterly is included four times a year.

The magazine's parent company Blue Water Media also publishes Cruising Compass, a free weekly e-newsletter.

References

External links
Blue Water Sailing
Cruising Compass
Multihulls Quarterly

Magazines established in 1996
Magazines published in Rhode Island
Monthly magazines published in the United States
Sailing magazines